Jim Sandusky (born September 9, 1961) is an American former professional football player who was a wide receiver in the Canadian Football League (CFL) for the BC Lions and Edmonton Eskimos.  In a 12-year career from 1984 to 1996, he caught 586 passes for 9,737 yards and 69 touchdowns.

Sandusky played college football at the University of Nevada, Las Vegas (UNLV) and San Diego State University. As a senior with the San Diego State Aztecs in 1983, he was named a third-team All-American by the Gannett News Service and Football News. He earned first-team all-conference honors in the Western Athletic Conference as both a receiver and a punt returner. He was the most valuable player of the 1984 Hula Bowl.

See also
 List of NCAA major college yearly punt and kickoff return leaders

References

1961 births
Living people
American football wide receivers
American players of Canadian football
Canadian football wide receivers
BC Lions players
Edmonton Elks coaches
Edmonton Elks players
San Diego State Aztecs football players
UNLV Rebels football players
People from Othello, Washington